Luis Vera (22 December 1929 – 28 June 2014) was a Chilean footballer. He played in 14 matches for the Chile national football team from 1954 to 1959. He was also part of Chile's squad for the 1959 South American Championship that took place in Argentina.

References

External links
 
 

1929 births
2014 deaths
Chilean footballers
Chile international footballers
Place of birth missing
Association football defenders
Audax Italiano footballers
Chilean football managers
Huachipato managers
Deportes Concepción (Chile) managers
O'Higgins F.C. managers
Club Deportivo Universidad Católica managers
Lota Schwager managers
Universidad de Concepción managers